Mark Fletcher may refer to:

Mark Fletcher (businessman), American internet entrepreneur
Mark Fletcher (footballer), English former footballer
Mark Fletcher (politician), British Member of Parliament for Bolsover